Park So-dam (born September 8, 1991) is a South Korean actress. She came into popular recognition in the 2015 film The Priests and the TV series' Cinderella with Four Knights (2016) and Record of Youth (2020). She achieved international fame for her role in the 2019 critically acclaimed Korean comedy thriller film Parasite, which won the Palme d'Or at the 2019 Cannes Film Festival and the Academy Award for Best Picture.

Career
When Park was in high school, she watched the musical Grease and developed an interest in acting. While in university, Park started her career by turning to independent films after being rejected from around seventeen auditions. Known as a prolific performer in independent cinema, Park starred in the Korean Academy of Film Arts feature Ingtoogi: Battle of the Internet Trolls and the indie Steel Cold Winter, the latter of which drew notice when it premiered at the Busan International Film Festival. Park also took small parts in mainstream titles Scarlet Innocence and The Royal Tailor.

She broke into the mainstream in 2015 after making a strong impression with her performance in The Silenced, which nabbed her a win for Best Supporting Actress from the Busan Film Critics Awards. She then featured in box office hits Veteran and The Throne, which led to her casting in the critically acclaimed mystery thriller The Priests. Her role as an evil possessed high school student won her multiple Best New Actress nods.

Park also extended her filmography to television. In 2016, she took the lead role in KBS2's medical drama A Beautiful Mind and tvN's romantic comedy series Cinderella with Four Knights.

In 2019, Park starred in Bong Joon-ho's black comedy, Parasite. The film received international critical acclaim and was a box office success in South Korea. She gained recognition for her role as  a crafty, whipsmart younger sister of the family, and became known for her "Jessica Jingle". In the same year, Park joined the variety show Three Meals a Day: Mountain Village along with Yum Jung-ah and Yoon Se-ah.

In 2020, Park was cast in the youth drama Record of Youth as an aspiring makeup artist. In the same year, Park participated in the variety show Gamsung Camping which is a camping variety show with Park Na-rae, Ahn Young-mi, Son Na-eun, Solar. Later, Park made her comeback in the stage play The Student and Mr. Henri, a stage play she performed in 2017.

In 2022, Park returned to the big screen in three years in the crime action film Special Delivery, playing a professional delivery driver. In 2023, she starred in Lee Hae-young's spy action film Phantom as a Korean secretary to a high-ranking Japanese officer in 1933.

Personal life 
On December 13, 2021, it was revealed that Park So-dam had been diagnosed with papillary thyroid cancer during a regular health checkup, and has undergone surgery according to the opinion of the medical staff. Park will focus on recovering her health. On February 7, 2022, Park's agency confirmed that Park has just recovered from COVID-19.

Filmography

Film

Television series

Web series

Television shows

Hosting

Radio shows

Theater

Discography

Singles

Ambassadorship 
 Honorary Ambassador for Efficient Tourism in Korea (2021)

Awards and nominations

References

External links 

 
 

1991 births
Living people
South Korean film actresses
South Korean television actresses
South Korean web series actresses
Korea National University of Arts alumni
Outstanding Performance by a Cast in a Motion Picture Screen Actors Guild Award winners
21st-century South Korean actresses
Best New Actress Paeksang Arts Award (film) winners